The 1996 AFC Asian Cup qualification involved 33 participating teams. The United Arab Emirates (hosts) and Japan (holders) qualified automatically for the 1996 AFC Asian Cup.

Qualification

Group 1 

All matches played in Vietnam.

Group 2 

All matches played in Hong Kong.

Group 3 

All matches played in Singapore and Thailand in a double round-robin format.

Group 4 

All matches played in Malaysia

Group 5 

All matches played in Iran and Oman in a double round-robin format.

Group 6 

 withdrew
All matches played in Jordan

Group 7 

All matches played on a home and away double round-robin format.

Group 8 

 withdrew

Uzbekistan won 5-4 on aggregate.

Group 9 

All matched played in Saudi Arabia

Group 10 

All matches played on a home and away double round-robin format.

Qualified teams

References 

Stokkermans, Karel. "Asian Nations Cup 1996". RSSSF.
Courtney, Barrie  "1996 MATCHES". RSSSF.

Q
AFC Asian Cup
Asian Cup qualification
Asian Cup qualification
Asian Cup qualification
Asian Cup qualification
Asian Cup qualification 
Asian Cup qualification 
Asian Cup qualification 
Asian Cup qualification
Asian Cup qualification
Asian Cup qualification
Asian Cup qualification
Asian Cup qualification
Asian Cup qualification
Asian Cup qualification
Asian Cup qualification
Asian Cup qualification
Asian Cup qualification
AFC Asian Cup qualification